The women's 500 metres speed skating competition of the 2018 Winter Olympics was held on 18 February 2018 at Gangneung Oval in Gangneung.

Summary
Pre-race favourites were Nao Kodaira, winner of every single pre-Olympic ISU World Cup 500m in the 2017/18 season, and Lee Sang-hwa, world record holder at this distance and two-time Olympic 500m gold medallist.

Skating in the fourth pair, Jorien Ter Mors posted a time of 37.53, which stood until Brittany Bowe improved it by 0.009 seconds in the eleventh pair. Starting in pair 16 versus Karolína Erbanová, Japan's Nao Kodaira raced to an Olympic and sea-level record of 36.94, clocking an unprecedented lap time of 26.68 - a pace for the longest time deemed "impossible" even at altitude (which Gangneung is not). In pair 15, South Korea's Lee Sang-hwa opened faster than Kodaira and was up two tenths in back straight intermediate timings. However, an imperfect final inner turn saw her lose this advantage and cross the line 0.39 seconds down in 37.33 to take second place - a mere 0.01 seconds ahead of Erbanová's time. Vanessa Herzog, 500m gold medallist at the 2018 European Speed Skating Championships, was unable to challenge for a medal in the final pair, finishing fourth.

Competition schedule
All times are (UTC+9).

Records
Prior to this competition, the existing world, Olympic and track records were as follows.

The following records were set during this competition.

OR = Olympic record, TR = track record, WB = world best

Results
The races were held at 20:56.

References

Women's speed skating at the 2018 Winter Olympics